Rudry is a small village and community located to the east of Caerphilly in Wales. As a community Rudry contains not only the village of Rudry, but also the villages of Draethen, Garth and Waterloo. The population of the community at the 2011 census was 1,053.

The village is a rural location, surrounded by woods with walks along the Rhymney Valley Ridgeway Walk. Its main attraction being the Maen llwyd Inn. Another pub, The Griffin was located near the local church. It is thought that Oliver Cromwell took shelter in St James's church, which has existed in the village since the 13th century.

The community was once served by two small railway stations— Waterloo Halt and Fountain Bridge Halt. Both closed in 1956.

References

External links

www.geograph.co.uk : photos of Rudry and surrounding area
Rudry Community Council
St. James Monumental Inscriptions

Villages in Caerphilly County Borough
Communities in Caerphilly County Borough